The 67th parallel north is a circle of latitude that is 67 degrees north of the Earth's equatorial plane, about 50 km north of the Arctic Circle. It crosses the Atlantic Ocean, Europe, Asia and North America.

At this latitude the sun is visible for 24 hours, 0 minutes during the summer solstice and 1 hour, 30 minutes during the winter solstice. Every day of the month of March (post-equinox) can view both astronomical dawn and astronomical dusk.

Around the world
Starting at the Prime Meridian and heading eastwards, the parallel 67° north passes through:

{| class="wikitable plainrowheaders"
! scope="col" width="125" | Co-ordinates
! scope="col" | Country, territory or ocean
! scope="col" | Notes
|-
| style="background:#b0e0e6;" | 
! scope="row" style="background:#b0e0e6;" rowspan="3" | Atlantic Ocean
| style="background:#b0e0e6;" | Norwegian Sea
|-
| style="background:#b0e0e6;" | 
| style="background:#b0e0e6;" | Vestfjorden, Norwegian Sea
|-
| style="background:#b0e0e6;" | 
| style="background:#b0e0e6;" | Fugløyfjorden, Norwegian Sea
|-
| 
! scope="row" | 
| Høgstjerna, Nordland
|-
| style="background:#b0e0e6;" | 
! scope="row" style="background:#b0e0e6;" | Atlantic Ocean
| style="background:#b0e0e6;" | Sørfjorden, Norwegian Sea
|-
| 
! scope="row" | 
| Mainland Nordland
|-
| style="background:#b0e0e6;" | 
! scope="row" style="background:#b0e0e6;" | Atlantic Ocean
| style="background:#b0e0e6;" | Morsdalsfjorden, Norwegian Sea
|-
| 
! scope="row" | 
| Mainland Nordland
|-
| 
! scope="row" | 
|rowspan=2|north of the Gulf of Bothnia
|-
| 
! scope="row" | 
|-
| 
! scope="row" | 
|
|-
| style="background:#b0e0e6;" | 
! scope="row" style="background:#b0e0e6;" | Arctic Ocean
| style="background:#b0e0e6;" | Kandalaksha Gulf, White Sea, Barents Sea
|-
| 
! scope="row" | 
|
|-
| style="background:#b0e0e6;" | 
! scope="row" style="background:#b0e0e6;" | Arctic Ocean
| style="background:#b0e0e6;" | White Sea, Barents Sea
|-
| 
! scope="row" | 
| Kanin Peninsula
|-
| style="background:#b0e0e6;" | 
! scope="row" style="background:#b0e0e6;" | Arctic Ocean
| style="background:#b0e0e6;" | Chosha Bay, Barents Sea
|-
| 
! scope="row" | 
|
|-
| style="background:#b0e0e6;" | 
! scope="row" style="background:#b0e0e6;" | Arctic Ocean
| style="background:#b0e0e6;" | Gulf of Ob, Kara Sea
|-
| 
! scope="row" | 
|
|-
| style="background:#b0e0e6;" | 
! scope="row" style="background:#b0e0e6;" | Arctic Ocean
| style="background:#b0e0e6;" | Chukchi Sea
|-
| 
! scope="row" | 
| Alaska 
|-
| 
! scope="row" | 
| Yukon Northwest Territories - passing through the northernmost point of Great Bear Lake Nunavut
|-
| style="background:#b0e0e6;" | 
! scope="row" style="background:#b0e0e6;" | Arctic Ocean
| style="background:#b0e0e6;" | Foxe Basin
|-
| 
! scope="row" | 
| Nunavut - Baffin Island
|-
| style="background:#b0e0e6;" | 
! scope="row" style="background:#b0e0e6;" | Arctic Ocean
| style="background:#b0e0e6;" | Davis Strait
|-
| 
! scope="row" | 
| Russell GlacierPassing just south of Cape Warming
|-
| style="background:#b0e0e6;" | 
! scope="row" style="background:#b0e0e6;" | Atlantic Ocean
| style="background:#b0e0e6;" | Denmark StraitGreenland Sea — passing just south of Kolbeinsey,  (at )Norwegian Sea
|-
|}

See also
66th parallel north
68th parallel north
Arctic Circle

n67
Geography of the Arctic